Marco Lazzaroni (born 18 May 1995) is an Italian rugby union player who plays as a Lock. He currently competes for Benetton in the Pro14.

Born in Udine, Marco played locally before joining Mogliano. In summer 2014, he joined Benetton Treviso.

From 2013 to 2015, Lazzaroni was named in the Italy Under 20 squad and in 2018 in the Italy Sevens squad.
From 2017 he was also member of Italy squad. On 8 November 2021 he was named in the Italy A squad for the 2021 end-of-year rugby union internationals.

References

External links

1995 births
Italian rugby union players
Living people
Italy international rugby union players
Rugby union flankers
Mogliano Rugby players
CA Brive players
Benetton Rugby players